Dzierzgowo  is a village in Mława County, Masovian Voivodeship, in east-central Poland. It is the seat of the gmina (administrative district) called Gmina Dzierzgowo.

The village has a population of 660.

References

Villages in Mława County